The 1990–91 season was FC Dinamo București's 42nd season in Divizia A. It is the first season started after the Romanian Revolution, event that opened the borders. Because of this, Dinamo lost almost an entire team, and also his coach, Mircea Lucescu, all of them starting their careers abroad. That's why Dinamo started to build another team and ended this season without silverware. In the championship, the team finished third, seven points behind champions Universitatea Craiova. The same team from Oltenia ended the dream for Dinamo in the Romanian Cup.

In the European Cup, Dinamo began with the elimination of Irish team St Patrick's Athletic Dublin (4-0 and 1-1). Dinamo was eliminated in the second round by FC Porto.

Results

European Cup 

First round

Dinamo București beat St Patrick's Athletic 5-1 on aggregate.

Second round

Porto beat Dinamo București 4-0 on aggregate.

Squad 

Goalkeepers: Bogdan Stelea (26/0), Costel Câmpeanu (8/0).

Defenders: Adrian Matei (26/2), Tibor Selymes (26/2), Anton Doboş (22/1), Tudorel Cristea (16/4), Iulian Mihăescu (15/1), Mircea Rednic (15/0), Augustin Eduard (11/0), Bogdan Bucur (5/0), Alexandru Nicolae (3/0), Michael Klein (2/0), Cristinel Atomulesei (0/0).

Midfielders: Constantin Marcu (29/8), Marius Cheregi (29/5), Costel Pană (24/3), Ionel Fulga (19/0), Cezar Zamfir (18/0), Daniel Timofte (15/2), Vasile Miriuță (15/1), Dorin Mateuţ (8/5), Mircea Tertici (1/0), Răzvan Matache (1/0).

Forwards: Marian Damaschin (31/15), Sorin Răducanu (14/1), Daniel Scînteie (5/0), Marian Savu (4/0), Claudiu Vaişcovici (4/0), Costel Orac (2/1).

Transfers 

Dinamo brought Augustin Eduard (Argeș Pitești), Marius Cheregi (FC Bihor), Constantin Marcu (Flacăra Moreni), Tibor Selymes (FC Braşov), Costel Pană (Flacăra Moreni) and Ionel Fulga. In the winter break, Vasile Miriuţă was brought from FC Maramureş and Tudorel Cristea from Sportul Studenţesc.

In the summer break left the team Sorin Colceag (Universitatea Cluj), Ioan Andone (Elche), Michael Klein (Bayer Uerdingen), Ioan Lupescu (Bayer Leverkusen), Dănuţ Lupu (Panathinaikos), Ioan Sabău (Feyenoord), Florin Răducioiu (Bari).

In the winter break, Dorin Mateuţ left the team for Real Zaragoza, Daniel Timofte for Bayer Uerdingen and Mircea Rednic was transferred to Bursaspor.

External links 
 www.labtof.ro
 www.romaniansoccer.ro

FC Dinamo București seasons
Dinamo Bucuresti